Revan Joni Nurianto (born 14 June 2002) is an Indonesian professional footballer who plays as a winger for Liga 2 club Persela Lamongan.

Club career

Persela Lamongan
He was signed for Persela Lamongan to play in Liga 1 in the 2021 season. Revan made his first-team debut on 4 September 2021 in a match against PSIS Semarang at the Wibawa Mukti Stadium, Cikarang.

Career statistics

Club

Notes

References

External links
 Revan Nurianto at Soccerway
 Revan Nurianto at Liga Indonesia

2002 births
Living people
Indonesian footballers
Persela Lamongan players
Association football midfielders
People from Bojonegoro Regency
Sportspeople from East Java